General elections were held in Dominica on 31 January 2000 and saw the Dominica Labour Party led by Rosie Douglas take power defeating the previous government of the United Workers' Party led by Edison James, despite the UWP receiving more votes. The DLP won 10 seats, the UWP 9 seats and the Dominica Freedom Party took 2 seats. Voter turnout was 59.25%. The Dominica Labour Party formed a government in coalition with the Dominica Freedom Party. Voter turnout was 60.2%, the lowest since the introduction of universal suffrage in 1951.

Campaign
The ruling United Workers' Party campaigned on their economic record while the Dominica Labour Party focused on charges of corruption against the government.

Results

References

External links
Full results of 2000 election

Elections in Dominica
Dominica
General
Dominica